Pakistan competed at the 2010 Commonwealth Games held in Delhi, India, from 3 to 14 October 2010.

Medalist

Opening ceremony flag controversy
The flag bearer for Pakistan at the opening ceremony was scheduled to be weight-lifter Shujauddin Malik but as the teams entered the stadium the chef de mission, Dr. Mohammad Ali Shah insisted on carrying the flag himself.
Pakistan weightlifting manager Rashid Mehmood said the team had considered a boycott in protest at the actions of the official but later withdrew their threat after Pakistan Olympic Association chief, Arif Hasan, assured them Shah would be sanctioned for his actions.

Athletics 
Pakistan sent 2 para athletes.

Para-Sport - Men

Boxing

Pakistan sent 6 Boxers to 2010 Commonwealth Games.
In the team is also the boxer Amir Khan's brother Haroon Khan who is a British Pakistani and was offered to represent the country on behalf of his dual nationality.

Men

Officials
 Manager: Maj Nasir Ejaz Tung
 Coaches: Francisco Herandez Roldan and Ejaz Mehmood

Field Hockey

Men
Pakistan has been drawn into Group A with Australia, India, Malaysia and Scotland.
The following is a list of players and officials:

Players
 Zeeshan Ashraf (captain)
 Mohammad Imran
 Mohammad Irfan
 Waseem Ahmad
 Mohammad Rashid
 Fareed Ahmad
 Shafqat Rasool
 Rehan Butt
 Shakeel Abbasi
 Abdul Haseem Khan
 Muhammad Waqas Sharif
 Mohammad Rizwan
 Mohammad Umar Bhutta
 Imran Shah (goal keeper)
 Muhammad Tauseeq
 Muhammad Kashif Javed

Officials
 Khawaja Muhammad Junaid (manager)
 Michel van den Heuvel (coach)
 Ahmad Alam and Ajmal Khan Lodhi (assistant coaches)
 Faizur Rehman (physio)
 Nadeem Khan Lodhi (video analyst)

Pool A

Fifth and sixth place

Goal Scorers

Shooting

Pakistan will send 6 male shooters and 1 female shooter to 2010 Commonwealth Games.

Pistol - Men

Pistol - Women

Clay Target - Men

Officials
 Coach: Razi Ahmed Khan

Squash

Pakistan sent 4 males squash players to 2010 Commonwealth Games.

Men

Singles

Doubles

Official
 Malik Amjad Ali Noon

Tennis

Pakistan sent 2 tennis players to 2010 Commonwealth Games, one of whom is the recently successful US Open doubles runner-up Aisam-ul-Haq Qureshi.

Men

Officials
 Coach: Mohammad Khalid

Weightlifting

Pakistan sent 6 weightlifters and 1 para athlete to 2010 Commonwealth Games.

Men

Para-Sport Powerlifting Men

Officials
Coach: Muhammad Ilyas Butt
Manager: Rashid Mahmood

Wrestling

Pakistan sent 6 wrestlers to the Games.

Freestyle - Men

Greco-Roman - Men

Officials
 Manager: Chaudhry Mohammad Asghar
 Head coach: Ghulam Raza Moazen
 Coach: Mohammad Anwar

See also
2010 Commonwealth Games

References

Pakistan at the Commonwealth Games
Nations at the 2010 Commonwealth Games
Commonwealth Games